Nadjet Fedoul (born 28 October 1981) is an Algerian former footballer who played as a goalkeeper. She has been a member of the Algeria women's national team.

Club career
Fedoul has played for FC Blida and ASE Alger Centre in Algeria.

International career
Fedoul capped for Algeria at senior level during the 2006 African Women's Championship.

References

External links

1981 births
Living people
People from Bologhine
Footballers from Algiers
Algerian women's footballers
Women's association football goalkeepers
Algeria women's international footballers
21st-century Algerian people
20th-century Algerian people